2nd Independent Division of Jilin Provincial Military District was formed on July 21, 1966 from the Public Security Contingent of Jilin province. The division was composed of five regiments (5th to 9th), a total of 7417 personnel.

The divisional HQ stationed at Changchun, Jilin.

In February 1976 the division was disbanded. In August the disbandment was completed.

References

Independent divisions of the People's Liberation Army
Military units and formations established in 1966
Military units and formations disestablished in 1976